The Layzell Merlin is a British autogyro that was designed by Scottish designer Jim Montgomery and produced by Layzell Gyroplanes of Quedgeley, Gloucester.  The aircraft was supplied as a kit for amateur construction.

The type remained in production by Layzell through 2011, although by July 2012 the company website had been removed from the internet.

Design and development
The Merlin features a single main rotor, a single-seat open cockpit with a fairing and a windshield, tricycle landing gear with wheel pants and a twin cylinder, air-cooled, two-stroke, single-ignition  Rotax 582 engine in pusher configuration.

The aircraft fuselage is made from bolted-together square aluminum tubing.

After taking over Montgomery's design, company owner Gary Layzell expressed an interest in further developing the Merlin, but initially produced it unchanged.

Operational history
By January 2013, 28 examples had been registered in the United Kingdom with the CAA as Montgomerie-Bensen B8MR.

Specifications (Merlin GTS)

References

External links
Layzell Gyroplanes website archives on Archive.org
Photo of a Layzell Merlin GTS

1990s British sport aircraft
Homebuilt aircraft
Single-engined pusher autogyros
Layzell Gyroplanes